"Adiós Amor" is a song originally composed by Salvador Garza, and it was first recorded and released as a banda ballad by Los Dareyes de la Sierra in 2008. In 2017 Christian Nodal recorded the song with mariachi made his version a bolero.

Other cover versions 
In May 2018, Bolivian group Orquesta Internacional Guachambe released a tropical version of the song. Their version had airplay success in their native country.

In May 2018, Chilean group Noche de Brujas released a cumbia version cover the song.

In September 2018, Peruvian singer Daniela Darcourt released a salsa version cover the song. Her cover reached the number 4 position in Perú.

In October 2018, American duo Ha*Ash recorded a cover version for her Spotify Singles.

Christian Nodal version 

"Adiós Amor" is the debut single by Mexican singer Christian Nodal. "Adiós Amor" reached number one on the Top 20 General Mexican Songs Chart and number two on the Billboard Top Latin Songs chart in the United States. It also won Regional Mexican Song of the Year at the 2018 Billboard Latin Music Awards.

Promotion
To promote the release of the song, Mexican singer Julión Álvarez invited Nodal to sing on stage at a sold-out concert in Guadalajara, Mexico in December 2016.

Chart performance
In the United States, the single entered Billboards Hot Latin Songs and peaked at number four, while the song peaked at number one on Billboard's Regional Mexican Songs in 2017. The song became the first regional Mexican song to garner a top five spot of the Hot Latin Songs since 2016. In Mexico, the song peaked at number one on the Mexico Top 20 General Monitor Latino chart.

Charts

Weekly charts

Year-end charts

Certifications

Release history

See also
List of number-one songs of 2017 (Mexico)
List of best-selling Latin singles in the United States

References

2017 songs
2017 singles
Mexican folk songs
Ranchera songs
Spanish-language songs
Universal Music Latin Entertainment singles
Monitor Latino Top General number-one singles
Christian Nodal songs